Beer in Sweden has a history that can be traced to the late Iron Age.

History
 
Ale brewing has a long history in Sweden, predating written records. It is known, through old writings such as Hávamál, that the Norse culture used brewing to produce ale and mead. Mead was preferred and ale was the most common. Scandinavians also had access to wine and beer. Modern reproductions of Norse brews have been known to produce ale as strong as 9 percent ABV.  Up until the 19th century brewing was mostly a matter of production for household needs. The beer was usually weak in alcoholic content and used as an everyday beverage. For celebrations and feasts, stronger "feast-beer" and potent mead was brewed. With the advent of industrialism, all this changed. As the cities grew, home brewing became impossible for most people, and so the Swedish brewing industry arose.

In the mid-19th century, a multitude of small breweries grew into existence in the larger cities of Sweden, and every town had at least one brewery. In the beginning of the 20th century, a trend of consolidation with mergers and buyouts began, which culminated in the late 1970s and the beginning of 1980. This led to the formation of three large brewery conglomerates; Pripps, Spendrups and Falcon, and pushed the smaller breweries to the verge of extinction. This led to a stereotype of the Swedish beers available as easily drinkable lagers, and lacking in taste and character.

In the late 1980s and the beginning of the 1990s a new generation of small breweries spearheaded by the likes of Stockholm's Nils Oscar Brewery began to grow alongside the large companies. These companies offer customers more in the way of choice and many of the beers now produced in Sweden are of the very highest international quality, produced with carefully cultivated brewing yeasts (often imported from Germany, Belgium or Britain).

Classification

Swedish law defines two alcohol thresholds that govern where and to whom a given type of beer may be sold. Lättöl, i.e. beer below the lower threshold (2.25% by volume) is considered a lättdryck (light beverage) and may be sold anywhere with no age restriction. Starköl, beer above the upper threshold (3.5% by volume) may only be sold in Systembolaget stores to people aged 20 or above and in pubs to people aged 18 or above. Folköl, beer between the two thresholds may be sold in grocery stores but only to people aged 18 or above.

Since the 3.5% threshold is reasonably close to the alcohol content of an international lager beer, many international brands such as Heineken, Carlsberg and Pilsner Urquell are sold in two versions in Sweden - the internationally renowned product as a starköl at Systembolaget and a slightly watered-down version as a folköl in the grocery stores.

Economy
The modern trend is toward consumers increasingly choosing stronger beer than the 3.5% abv brands, generally referred to as folköl (people's beer) sold at grocery stores. Any stronger beer is sold exclusively at the government owned retail monopoly Systembolaget.

See also

 Beer and breweries by region

References